Prudhomme Lake Provincial Park is a provincial park just east of Prince Rupert in British Columbia, Canada.

References

External links

Provincial parks of British Columbia
North Coast Regional District
1964 establishments in British Columbia
Protected areas established in 1964